Sakellaropoulos is a Greek surname. The feminine form is Sakellaropoulou (Σακελλαροπούλου). It may refer to:

 Iraklis Sakellaropoulos (1888-unknown), Greek long-distance runner
 Katerina Sakellaropoulou, Greek judge and President of Greece
 Menios Sakellaropoulos, Greek journalist and novelist
 Theodoros Sakellaropoulos, Greek chess master

See also
 Sakellaridis
 Sakellarios (surname)

Greek-language surnames